Memorama is the second studio album released by Mexican rock band Allison. It was released on March 27, 2008, in Mexico, through Sony BMG.

Track listing

Personnel
All credits adapted from AllMusic.

Allison
Erik Canales - lead vocals, guitar
Abraham "Fear" Jarquín - guitar
Manuel "Manolín" Ávila - bass, backing vocals
Diego Stommel - drums
Production
Produced by Eduardo del Aguila
Additional production by Gabriel Castañón
Additional musicians
Güido Laris - vocal director, vocals
Ilan Rubin - drums on "Algo Que Decir"

Certifications

References

External links
 Memorama on Myspace (in Spanish)

2008 albums
Allison (band) albums